Events in the year 1999 in Eritrea.

Incumbents 

 President: Isaias Afewerki

Events 

 29 January – United Nations Security Council resolution 1226 was adopted unanimously and strongly urged the country to accept an agreement proposed by the Organisation of African Unity (OAU) to resolve the conflict between the country and Ethiopia.

Deaths

References 

 
1990s in Eritrea
Years of the 20th century in Eritrea
Eritrea
Eritrea